The 2019 Japanese Evolution Championship Series, commonly referred to as Evo Japan 2019, was a fighting game event held in Fukuoka, Japan on February 15–17. This was the second Evo event to take place in Japan. The event offered tournaments for various fighting games, such as Street Fighter V, Tekken 7, and King of Fighters XIV.

Games
Evo Japan 2019 featured six games in its lineup as announced through the office website. The lineup consisted of Street Fighter V: Arcade Edition, Tekken 7, King of Fighters XIV, BlazBlue: Cross Tag Battle, Soulcalibur VI, and Guilty Gear Xrd REV 2.

Results

References

External links
Official website

2019 fighting game tournaments
Evolution Championship Series
Esports competitions in Japan